Hubert Foidl (born 4 August 1942) is a Danish sports shooter. He competed in two events at the 1988 Summer Olympics.

References

1942 births
Living people
Danish male sport shooters
Olympic shooters of Denmark
Shooters at the 1988 Summer Olympics
People from Garmisch-Partenkirchen (district)
Sportspeople from Upper Bavaria